Charles Joseph "Butch" Swindells (born 1942) is a former United States Ambassador to New Zealand and Samoa. He was appointed to the position by U.S. President George W. Bush, with the strong support of his home state of Oregon's two U.S. Senators. He served from 2001 to 2005.

Swindells earned a B.S. from Lewis & Clark College in 1964, and served as a trustee there from 1998 to 2001. He also attended Willamette University College of Law. After law school, he went into finance and investing. In 1968, he and law school roommate Jeffrey Grayson founded Capital Consultants together; Swindells left that company in 1985 (and was not involved in the company's financial scandal of the late 1990s). He later co-founded Capital Trust Co., which became one of the largest trust companies in the Northwest, in 1981.

Swindells has served on the board of directors of Swift Energy Company and The Greenbrier Companies.

See also 
 Contents of the United States diplomatic cables leak (New Zealand)
 Petroleum Exploration and Production Association of New Zealand

References 

1942 births
Living people
Businesspeople from Oregon
Ambassadors of the United States to New Zealand
Ambassadors of the United States to Samoa
Willamette University College of Law alumni
Lewis & Clark College alumni
21st-century American diplomats